Arabinose is an aldopentose – a monosaccharide containing five carbon atoms, and including an aldehyde (CHO) functional group.

Properties 
For biosynthetic reasons, most saccharides are almost always more abundant in nature as the "D"-form, or structurally analogous to D-glyceraldehyde.  However, L-arabinose is in fact more common than D-arabinose in nature and is found in nature as a component of biopolymers such as hemicellulose and pectin.

The L-arabinose operon, also known as the araBAD operon, has been the subject of much biomolecular research. The operon directs the catabolism of arabinose in E. coli, and it is dynamically activated in the presence of arabinose and the absence of glucose.

A classic method for the organic synthesis of arabinose from glucose is the Wohl degradation.

{| class="wikitable" 
|- style="background-color:#FFDEAD;"
! colspan="2" | D-Arabinose
|- 
| align="center" | α-D-Arabinofuranose
| align="center" | β-D-Arabinofuranose
|- 
| align="center" | α-D-Arabinopyranose
| align="center" | β-D-Arabinopyranose
|}

Etymology
Arabinose gets its name from gum arabic, from which it was first isolated.

Use in foods 
Originally commercialized as a sweetener, arabinose is an inhibitor of sucrase, the enzyme that breaks down sucrose into glucose and fructose in the small intestine.

See also
 Arabinosyl nucleosides

Notes

References

Aldopentoses
Glycerols